The Athens–Piraeus Electric Railways, commonly abbreviated as ISAP, was a company which operated the Piraeus - Kifissia line from 1 January 1976 to 17 June 2011. Piraeus - Kifissia line was the oldest urban rapid transit system of Athens metropolitan area. The line opened in 1869 as a suburban railway line connecting Athens with its port of Piraeus and it was gradually converted to full rapid transit operations, making it one of the oldest metro lines in the world. The line which Isap S.A. operated evolved from the older Athens & Piraeus Railway and Lavrion Square-Strofyli railway.

In June 2011 ISAP S.A. was absorbed by a new transport company, STASY.

History

Athens and Piraeus Railway Company

The line from Piraeus to Thision was inaugurated on 27 February 1869 as a steam train connecting Athens and its port, Piraeus, and was operated by Athens & Piraeus Railway Co ( or ). The project was considered important, so Queen Olga and the Prime Minister Thrasyvoulos Zaimis attended the inauguration ceremony. There were 8 trains in each direction daily and 9 trains in each direction on Sundays.

In 1874 the Athens & Piraeus Railway Company was bought by the Bank of Industrial Credit. Under the new ownership the railway procured additional rolling stock. Soon the line was extended to Omonoia Square with an underground section constructed with the cut-and-cover method.

The line was electrified in 1904 using the 600 V DC, third rail, top contact system by Thomson Houston.

Hellenic Electric Railways Company

In 1926 the sister company Ilektriki Etaireia Metaforon or H.E.M., also part of Power Group, took over the  Lavrion Square-Strofyli railway. This line was eventually converted to standard gauge, double track and became an extension of the existing line, reaching Attiki in 1948 and Kifissia in 1958.

Athens-Piraeus Electric Railways
In 1976 E.I.S. was nationalized and renamed Athens-Piraeus Electric Railways S.A. (I.S.A.P).

A merger of ISAP with Athens Metro was dictated by Law 2668 in 1998, however it was postponed indefinitely and the required Presidential Decree was never issued. In January 2011 the Greek Government announced their plans to merge ISAP with Attiko Metro Etaireia Leitourgias S.A. (AMEL), the company which operates Athens Metro lines 2,3, and with Athens Tram S.A. in a single new company.

In March 2011, the Greek Government passed Law 3920 to allow ISAP and Athens Tram to be absorbed by Attiko Metro Operations Company (AMEL). The new company created from the mergers is named STASY and is a subsidiary of OASA S.A. The merger was officially announced on 10 June 2011.

STASY is based at the former ISAP head offices, near Omonoia Square in Athens. Kostas Vassiliadis, a former chief engineer (1976-1991) and later CEO of ISAP between 1997 and 2000 became Chairman and CEO of the merged company until the end of 2012.

Network and stations

Network
ISAP's line connected the port of Piraeus with the northern suburb of Kifissia. As it was originally designed for steam traction, the line runs mostly above ground. However, there are no level crossings. The two lines (ISAP and Metro Line 2) have a physical connection at Attiki station.

From Piraeus the line runs eastwards to Neo Faliro and then north to Thision. Between Monastiraki and Attiki the line runs underground. At Monastiraki passengers can change to Metro line 3 and at Omonoia and Attiki to Metro line 2. From Attiki the line continues north, following the alignment of the old Lavrion Square-Strofyli railway through Patissia, the suburbs of Nea Ionia, Irakleio, Marousi and terminates at Kifissia. At Neratziotissa passengers can change to the Athens Suburban Railway for Athens International Airport.

Stations

Proposed northern extension
	 
An extension to the north was under consideration that would have been built in two phases, reaching Nea Erithrea by the end of the first phase and Agios Stefanos by the end of the second phase. Due to lack of funding, this extension was canceled in 2011.

Rolling stock

First generation EMUs
Since electrification (1904) the railway used almost exclusively electric multiple unit (EMU) trains. The vehicles are classified in batches (or deliveries). The first four batches consisted of wooden passenger cars on iron or steel frames. Currently only a short train of two wooden railcars is preserved, modified with the addition of Scharfenberg couplers at each end and is displayed during special events.

The first generation rolling stock was numbered as in the following table:

Second generation EMUs
The fifth (1951), sixth (1958) and seventh (1968) batches were of steel construction, made by Siemens-MAN. At the same time Scharfenberg couplers were introduced.

Third generation EMUs
Batch 8 (1983–1985) consists of five-car trains made by Siemens-MAN. Trains of batch 9 were made by LEW in the German Democratic Republic and have been withdrawn.  The trains of the 10th batch (1994), similar to those of the 8th batch, were built by Hellenic Shipyards S.A. using Simenes-MAN design and mechanical parts. The 11th batch (2002) trains, with three phase AC motors were also constructed by Hellenic Shipyards S.A. using ADtranz-Siemens design and mechanical parts.

Other rolling stock

During 1981-1984 ISAP leased six four-car, bright yellow trains of narrow loading gauge (type G-I or Gisela) from East Berlin's metro.

In the early 1980s consideration was given to the purchase of 60 secondhand cars of London Underground R Stock, built between 1938 and 1959, but ultimately no deal was made and new carriages were purchased instead.

Gallery

See also

 Piraeus-Perama light railway
 Lavrion Square-Strofyli railway
 Attica Railways
 Athens Mass Transit System
 Athens Metro
 Line 1 (Athens Metro)
 Budapest–Belgrade–Skopje–Athens railway

References

Further reading

 

Transport in Athens
Piraeus
Electric railways in Greece
Defunct railway companies of Greece
Railway lines opened in 1869
Railway companies established in 1976
Rail transport in Attica
1869 establishments in Greece
Greek companies established in 1976